The Mount St. Mary's Mountaineers women's basketball represents Mount St. Mary's University in Emmitsburg, Maryland, United States. The school competes in the Metro Atlantic Athletic Conference. They play their home games at Knott Arena.

History
Mount St. Mary's began play in 1974. The Mountaineers finished 3rd in the 1982 Division II Tournament, beating Virginia Union 71–51 and Norfolk State 82–64 before losing to California Poly-Pomona 71–58 but beating Oakland 73–62 to finish 3rd. The Mountaineers joined Division I in 1988 and joined the Northeast Conference the next year. Previously they had played in the Mason-Dixon Conference. As of the end of the 2015–16 season, the Mountaineers have an all-time record of 702–467. In their two NCAA Division I Tournament appearances, they lost each time in the First Round, losing 70–47 to Iowa in 1994 and 82–55 to Alabama in 1995. Since then, Mount St. Mary's has only reached the postseason once, reaching the WNIT in 2014.

Postseason results
The Mountaineers have an 0–4 record in four NCAA Tournament appearances at the Division I level.

NCAA Division I tournament results

NCAA Division II tournament results

References

External links